Main Line Broadcasting was an American media company, based in Philadelphia, Pennsylvania.  At its peak, Main Line Broadcasting owned 19 radio stations in four markets in the United States.  The company was founded by Dan Savadove, and was most recently run by CEO Marc Guralnick.  Main Line was backed by the Arlington Capital Group, a private equity company.

Main Line's original operating strategy was to purchase and operate radio stations in mid-size Arbitron markets, generally those ranked between 50 and 150 in Arbitron's market size list.

History

Main Line's first acquisition was Dame Broadcasting's 5-station group in Hagerstown, Maryland in August 2005.  In December 2005, Main Line purchased four stations from MainQuad Broadcasting in the Richmond, Virginia market.

In May 2007, Main Line doubled in size with the purchase of ten stations from Radio One in the Louisville, Kentucky and Dayton, Ohio markets.  In October 2008, it downsized its Louisville, Kentucky cluster as part of company-wide budget cutting.  In doing so, the entire WLRS airstaff was released.  WLRS retained its rock format.

On April 17, 2014, L&L Broadcasting announced that it has agreed to purchase all of Main Line's stations as part of a merger with Alpha Broadcasting.  The combined entity will be known as Alpha Media.  The sale closed on July 1, 2014.

Former Stations
All of these stations are owned by Alpha Media as of July 1, 2014.

References

Defunct radio broadcasting companies of the United States
Companies based in Philadelphia